The flag of the Federation of Arab Republics was the flag of Egypt, Libya and Syria from 1972–1977. The flag is a horizontal tricolour of red, white and black with a golden Hawk of Quraish placed on the center on the white stripe.

The flag was abandoned in Libya in 1977 after Muammar Gaddafi established the Socialist People's Libyan Arab Jamahiriya and adopted a green flag.

Egypt and Syria continue to still used the flag of the FAR until the early 1980s. Syria adopted a new flag in 1980 and Egypt in 1984.

Gallery

See also
Flag of Egypt
Flag of Libya
Flag of Syria
Hawk of Quraish

1972 establishments in Egypt
1972 establishments in Libya
1972 establishments in Syria
1977 disestablishments in Libya
1980 disestablishments in Syria
1984 disestablishments in Egypt
Flags introduced in 1972
History of Libya under Muammar Gaddafi
Flags of Egypt